Md. Mahbubur Rahman Talukder (known as Mahbubur Rahman; born 1 January 1954) is a Bangladesh Awami League politician and a former Jatiya Sangsad member representing the Patuakhali-4 constituency during 2001–2018. He also served as the state minister of water resources during 2009–2014.

Background and career
Rahman has a M.A. and a law degree.

Rahman was elected to Parliament in 2001, 2008, and 2014 from Patuakhali-4 as a Bangladesh Awami League candidate.

On 23 February 2014, Anti-Corruption Commission (ACC) interrogated Rahman on charges of accumulation of wealth illegally. On 21 August, ACC charged him formally. According to Rahman's submitted wealth statement, his land asset rose from 20 acres in 2008  to 2,865 acres in 2014.

Personal life
Rahman is married to Preeti  Haider.

References

Living people
1954 births
Awami League politicians
8th Jatiya Sangsad members
9th Jatiya Sangsad members
10th Jatiya Sangsad members
State Ministers of Water Resources (Bangladesh)